The episode list for the ABC comedy-drama series The Wonder Years. The series premiered on January 31, 1988 and ran for a total of 115 episodes spanning 6 seasons ending on May 12, 1993.

Originally, none of the seasons were available on DVD as official season box sets due to the cost of securing the music rights. (See The Wonder Years article for more detailed information.) Time Life released the complete series on DVD October 10, 2014.

Series overview

Episodes

Season 1 (1988)

Season 2 (1988–89)

Season 3 (1989–90)

Season 4 (1990–91)

Season 5 (1991–92)

Season 6 (1992–93)

References

External links
 
Episode information

Episodes
Lists of American comedy-drama television series episodes
Lists of American teen comedy television series episodes
Lists of American teen drama television series episodes
Lists of American sitcom episodes